Hinduism is a minority religion constituting about 0.15% of the population of Austria. Hinduism is not one of the 16 recognised religion in Austria. The Austrian law allows religious groups not recognized as societies, to seek official status 
as confessional communities with the Office for Religious Affairs. Hinduism is one of the  eight confessional 
communities in Austria. However the Sahaja Yoga and the International Society for Krishna Consciousness are categorised as associations, not as a confessional community.

History

In 1980 the Bengali Bimal Kundu founded the first Hindu religious society in Austria, for Hindus immigrating from the Indian subcontinent. He now runs a small temple, located at a room in the Afro-Asian Institute. Since 1998, the "Hindu Religious Society in Austria" is (hroe) as "state-registered confessional community" official representative for all Hindus. It is one of eleven religious groups that constitute confessional communities according to the Austrian Law on the Status of Religious Confessional Communities. It is not yet a legally recognised religion, and therefore is not eligible for support from the state, however they may be eligible for this after 20 years of existence.

Demographics

As of 2017, Hinduism constitute 0.15% of the population of Austria. There are about 11,000 Hindus in Austria.

Hindu groups in Austria
Hindu Mandir Association is one of the oldest organisation in Vienna. Established in 1991 has a yearly Krishna Janmaashtami, Ganesh Chaturthi, Diwali Mela festival & Bhagwati Jagran. In 2006, it applied for the status of religious confessional community but soon withdrew their applications and reapplied under the name Hindu Religious Community and was granted the new status.
ISKCON, more commonly known as the Hare Krishna movement has three centres in Austria, all located in Vienna: 
East of Eden, 
Govinda, 
 ISKCON Center for Vedic Studies. 
The Sri Krishna Chaitanya Mission has established a mandir in Vienna, which has a yearly Krishna Janmaashtami festival. 
Brahma Kumaris World Spiritual University (BKWSU), a new age neo-Hindu spiritual organisation has three centres in Austria, located in Vienna, Graz and Rankweil.
The Osho movement, Sahaja Yoga, Sai Baba, Sri Chinmoy also have a small presence. Along with Hare Krishna they are categorised as "sects". The term "sects" is used by the Government to denote small organizations with fewer than 100 members. Only the Hindu Religious Community has more than 100 members, and is the only Hindu organisation that constitutes one of the "confessional communities " in Austria.

See also
 Hinduism in Lithuania
 Hinduism in the West
 Religion in Austria

References

External links
Hindu Mandir Association
Hindu community in Austria (HRÖ)
Sri Sri Radha Govinda Mandir
ISKCON Austria & Germany (In German)
Churches and Religious communities in Vienna

Hinduism in Austria